Vegetia grimmia is a species of moth in the family Saturniidae. It was described by Carl Geyer in 1831. It is found in South Africa.

References

Endemic moths of South Africa
Moths described in 1831
Grimmia
Moths of Africa